Epistemic injustice is injustice related to knowledge. It includes exclusion and silencing; systematic distortion or misrepresentation of one's meanings or contributions; undervaluing of one's status or standing in communicative practices; unfair distinctions in authority; and unwarranted distrust.

An influential recent theory of epistemic injustice is that of British philosopher Miranda Fricker, who coined the term. According to Fricker, there are two kinds of epistemic injustice: testimonial injustice and hermeneutical injustice.

Related concepts include epistemic oppression and epistemic violence.

Testimonial injustice  

Testimonial injustice is unfairness related to trusting someone's word. An injustice of this kind can occur when someone is ignored, or not believed, because of their sex, sexuality, gender presentation, race, disability, or, broadly, because of their identity.

Fricker gives the example of Londoner Duwayne Brooks, who saw his friend Stephen Lawrence murdered. The police officers who arrived at the scene regarded Brooks with suspicion. According to an official inquiry, "the officers failed to concentrate upon Mr Brooks and to follow up energetically the information which he gave them. Nobody suggested that he should be used in searches of the area, although he knew where the assailants had last been seen. Nobody appears properly to have tried to calm him, or to accept that what he said was true." That is, the police officers failed to view Brooks as a credible witness, presumably in part due to racial bias. This was, says Fricker, a case of testimonial injustice, which occurs when "prejudice causes a hearer to give a deflated level of credibility to a speaker’s word."

Testimonial injustice is often accompanied by hermeneutical injustice, the topic of the next section.

Hermeneutical injustice  

Hermeneutical injustice is injustice related to how people interpret their lives. (The word hermeneutical comes from the Greek word for 'interpreter'.)

For example, in the 1970s, the phrase sexual harassment was introduced to describe something that many people, especially women, had long experienced. Before this time, a woman experiencing sexual harassment may have had difficulty putting her experience into words. According to Fricker, this difficulty is no accident, and is due largely to women's exclusion from full participation in the shaping of the English language. After the term sexual harassment was introduced, the same woman who experienced said harassment may have understood better what happened to her; however, she may have struggled to explain this experience to someone else, because the concept of sexual harassment was not yet well known. Fricker also states that this difficulty is also not accidental, and is due largely to women's exclusion from equal participation in journalism, publishing, academia, law, and the other institutions and industries that help people make sense of their lives. Fricker argues that some women's lives are less intelligible – to themselves, and/or to others – because women have historically wielded less power to shape the categories through which people understand the world. Fricker claims that this is also true of other marginalized groups.

Hermeneutical injustice occurs when someone's experiences are not well understood — by themselves or by others — because these experiences do not fit any concepts known to them (or known to others), due to the historic exclusion of some groups of people from activities, such as scholarship and journalism, that shape the language people use to make sense of their experiences.

Origins 
Though the term epistemic injustice was not coined until 1999, Vivian May has argued that civil rights activist Anna Julia Cooper in the 1890s anticipated the concept in claiming that Black women are denied full and equal recognition as knowers. Gaile Pohlhaus Jr. points to Gayatri Chakrovorty Spivak's 1988 essay "Can the Subaltern Speak?" as another anticipation. In that essay, Spivak describes what she calls epistemic violence occurring when subaltern persons are prevented from speaking for themselves about their own interests because of others claiming to know what those interests are.

Further developments 
Other scholars since Fricker have adapted the concept of epistemic injustice and/or expanded what the term includes. These contributions have included naming and narrowing down forms of epistemic injustice, such as: epistemic oppression, epistemicide, epistemic exploitation, silencing as testimonial quieting and as testimonial smothering, contributory injustice, distributive epistemic injustice, and epistemic trust injustice.

José Medina has advocated for an account of epistemic injustice that incorporates more voices and pays attention to context and the relationships at play. Elizabeth S. Anderson has argued that attention should be given to the structural causes and structural remedies of epistemic injustice. A closely related literature on epistemologies of ignorance has also been developing, which has included the identification of overlapping concepts such as white ignorance and willful hermeneutical ignorance.

American philosopher Kristie Dotson has warned that some definitions could leave out important contributions to the ongoing discussion around epistemic injustice. Gaile Pohlhaus Jr. has replied that the concept should therefore be considered an open one, and many different approaches to the concept should be considered.

In 2017, the Routledge Handbook of Epistemic Injustice was published, compiling chapters addressing both the theoretical work on the concept and efforts to apply that theory to practical case studies. The Indian political theorist Rajeev Bhargava uses the term epistemic injustice to describe how colonized groups were wronged when colonizing powers replaced, or negatively impacted, the concepts and categories that colonized groups used to understand themselves and the world. Similarly, in 2021, Professor Dr. Sabelo J. Ndlovu-Gatsheni mentions the term epistemicide and the Cognitive Empire to describe the discrimination of scholars and intellectuals from the Global South by Western academia and in the sphere of decolonisation studies. 

Genocide denial has been considered an example of epistemic injustice.

See also

Selected philosophers and theorists 
 Miranda Fricker
 José Medina
 Kristie Dotson
 Gaile Pohlhaus Jr. 
 Elizabeth S. Anderson
 David Coady
 Charles Mills
 Boaventura de Sousa Santos
 Sabelo J. Ndlovu-Gatsheni

References

Bibliography 
 
 
 Fricker, Miranda (2007). Epistemic Injustice: Power and the Ethics of Knowing. Oxford: Oxford University Press. .
 Kidd, Ian James, José Medina, and Gaile Pohlhaus Jr. (2017). The Routledge Handbook of Epistemic Injustice. Routledge. .
 
 —— (2013). The Epistemology of Resistance: Gender and Racial Oppression, Epistemic Injustice, and Resistant imaginations. Oxford: Oxford University Press. .
 
 
 

Injustice
Epistemology
Social epistemology